Münchwilen may refer to:

Münchwilen, Aargau, a municipality in the district of Laufenburg in the canton of Aargau, Switzerland
Münchwilen, Thurgau, a municipality in the canton of Thurgau, Switzerland, capital of Münchwilen district
 Münchwilen District, a district within the Swiss canton of Thurgau